Center or centre may refer to:

Mathematics 
Center (geometry), the middle of an object
 Center (algebra), used in various contexts
 Center (group theory)
 Center (ring theory)
 Graph center, the set of all vertices of minimum eccentricity

Places

United States
 Centre, Alabama
 Center, Colorado
 Center, Georgia
 Center, Indiana
 Center, Jay County, Indiana
 Center, Warrick County, Indiana
 Center, Kentucky
 Center, Missouri
 Center, Nebraska
 Center, North Dakota
 Centre County, Pennsylvania
 Center, Portland, Oregon
 Center, Texas
 Center, Washington
 Center, Outagamie County, Wisconsin
 Center, Rock County, Wisconsin
Center (community), Wisconsin
Center Township (disambiguation)
Centre Township (disambiguation)
Centre Avenue (disambiguation)
Center Hill (disambiguation)

Other countries
 Centre region, Hainaut, Belgium
 Centre Region, Burkina Faso
 Centre Region (Cameroon)
 Centre-Val de Loire, formerly Centre, France
 Centre (department), Haiti
 Centre Department (Ivory Coast)
 Centre (Chamber of Deputies of Luxembourg constituency)
 Centru (development region) (Centre), Romania
 Center, Celje, Slovenia
 Center District, Ljubljana, Slovenia
 Center District, Maribor, Slovenia
 Centre, Badalona, Catalonia, Spain

Sports 
 Center (gridiron football), a position in American and Canadian football
Centre (Australian rules football), a position on the Centre line
 Center (basketball), a position 
Centre (ice hockey), a position
Centre (rugby league), a position
Centre (rugby union), a position
 Center fielder, often called "center", a position in baseball

Other uses
 The Centre, a shorthand term for the central Government of India
 Centrism, the political middle ground between the left wing and the right wing
 The Center (political party), a political party in Switzerland
 Center (band), a Russian-speaking band
 Center (HTML element), coded with 
 Centre Academy East Anglia, an independent special school in Brettenham, Suffolk, England
 Centre College, a liberal arts college in Danville, Kentucky, United States
 Centre Radio, a former British radio station
 Centers (Fourth Way), in G.I. Gurdjieff's Fourth Way teaching
 Area control center, or center, in air traffic control

See also 

 Central (disambiguation)
 Center High School (disambiguation)
 Centre Party (disambiguation)
 The Centre (disambiguation)
 City centre
 Downtown
 Central business district